Geoffrey Hutchinson Crawford (5 February 1904 – 14 February 1942) was an English rower.

Rowing
He competed in the eights at the 1930 British Empire Games for England and won a gold medal.

He gained a blue for Oxford at The Boat Race 1926.

Personal life
He was an Agent at the time of the 1930 Games. Lieutenant Crawford was killed in action while serving with the Royal Artillery during World War II.

References

1904 births
1942 deaths
English male rowers
Commonwealth Games medallists in rowing
Commonwealth Games gold medallists for England
Rowers at the 1930 British Empire Games
British Army personnel killed in World War II
Royal Artillery officers
Alumni of Brasenose College, Oxford
Military personnel from Yorkshire
Medallists at the 1930 British Empire Games